The 1929 Calgary municipal election was held on November 20, 1929 to elect a Mayor and seven Aldermen to sit on Calgary City Council. Along with positions on Calgary City Council, four trustees for the Public School Board, three trustees for the Separate School Board, and seven questions put before the voters.

Calgary City Council governed under "Initiative, Referendum and Recall" which is composed of a Mayor, Commissioner and twelve Aldermen all elected to staggered two year terms. Commissioner Graves and five Aldermen: Peter Turner Bone, Eneas Edward McCormick, Harold Wigmore McGill, Edith Patterson, and Fred J. White elected in 1928 continued in their positions.

Background
The election was held under the Single Transferable Voting/Proportional Representation (STV/PR) with the term for candidates being two years.

Andrew Davison resigned his seat as Alderman halfway through his two-year term to run as a candidate for Mayor. Davison was the only candidate and was acclaimed upon the close of nominations on November 12, 1929.

John Walker Russell who received the 7th most votes through the runoff process was elected to a single-year term to replace Andrew Davison.

Results

Mayor
Andrew Davison - Acclaimed

Council
Quota for election was 1,254.

Public School Board

Separate school board

Plebiscites

Water main
Water main extension for $175,000. Approval requires two-thirds majority.
For - 4,479
Against - 1,423

Airport improvements
Airport improvements for $50,000. Approval requires two-thirds majority.
For - 2,601
Against - 3,225

River protection
River protection for $20,000. Approval requires two-thirds majority.
For - 3,970
Against - 1,955

Cemetery improvements
Cemetery improvements for $25,000. Approval requires two-thirds majority.
For - 3,911
Against - 2,025

Waterworks improvements
Waterworks improvements and construction of the Glenmore Reservoir for $3,770,000. Approval requires two-thirds majority.
For - 4,279
Against - 1,679

Business manager
Business manager. Approval requires majority.
For - 4,937
Against - 4,620

Fireman's hours
Fireman's hours. Approval requires majority.
For - 4,793
Against - 4,892

See also
List of Calgary municipal elections

References

1920s in Calgary
Municipal elections in Calgary
1929 elections in Canada